Stephan Bürgler (born 21 November 1987 in Klagenfurt) is an Austrian football player who currently plays for SK Austria Kärnten. He formerly played for FC Kärnten and on loan at ASKÖ Köttmansdorf.

External links
 Profile at T-Online 

1987 births
Living people
Austrian footballers
FC Kärnten players
Association football forwards